Lindskog is a Swedish surname. Notable people with the surname include:

Adolf Lindskog (1751–1836), Swedish-Finnish businessman and shipbuilder
Agneta Lindskog (born 1953), Swedish luger
Anders Lindskog (1875–1917), Swedish sport shooter
Bengt Lindskog (1933–2008), Swedish footballer
Doug Lindskog (born 1955), Canadian ice hockey player
Gustafva Lindskog (1794-1851), Swedish gymnast
Vic Lindskog (1914–2003), American football player

Swedish-language surnames